Basil Williams (11 March 1891 – 1951) was a British single skater and pair skater. With partner Phyllis Johnson, he won the bronze medal at the 1920 Summer Olympics. Before teaming up with Johnson, he competed with Enid Harrison. They placed 6th at the 1912 World Figure Skating Championships. He also competed as a single skater at the 1920 Olympics, placing 7th.

Results
(with Phyllis Johnson)

References

External links
 Basil Williams' profile at databaseOlympics
 Skatabase: 1908-1914 World Championships
 Skatabase: 1920 Olympics - Singles
 Skatabase: 1920s Olympics - Pairs'
 Basil Williams' profile at Sports Reference.com

1891 births
1951 deaths
British male single skaters
British male pair skaters
Olympic figure skaters of Great Britain
Olympic bronze medallists for Great Britain
Figure skaters at the 1920 Summer Olympics
Olympic medalists in figure skating
Medalists at the 1920 Summer Olympics